The longjaw mudsucker Gillichthys mirabilis is a goby (Gobiidae) of the Pacific Ocean coast of California and Baja California, noted for its extremely large mouth and ability to survive out of water for short periods.

As the common name suggests, the upper jaw is extremely long, reaching nearly to the opercular opening. The head is broad and flat, with the eyes placed close to the top (but still widely spaced). Overall color is a dark brown to olive on the upper parts, and yellowish below; a faint pattern of vertical bars may be visible,  and are prominent in juveniles. The first dorsal fin is relatively small, with 4-8 spines, while the second dorsal fin is larger, with 10-17 rays. The pectoral fins are broad and rounded, with from 15 to 23 rays. They can reach lengths of 21 cm.

These mudsuckers occur in estuaries, primarily in tidal sloughs with shallow mud-covered bottoms, where they often excavate burrows. When the tide goes out and the mud is exposed, they will retreat to their burrows or move into tidal channels; if trapped on the mud, they can wait for the next tide by gulping air buccopharyngeal chamber in the throat. They feed on nearly anything they can find in the mud, including small fish such as California killifish, but mostly live on invertebrates, the main choices depending on seasonal availability.

Their range extends from Tomales Bay in the north to Bahia Magdalena in the south. There is a disjunct population of longjaw mudsuckers in the northern section of the Gulf of California; this population has been evolving independently of populations in California/western Baja for an estimated 284 thousand years. A population in the Salton Sea was introduced in 1950, and now thrives there. They are considered good bait fish for freshwater fishing, such as on the Colorado River, because they can be kept alive packed in moist algae, and will not reproduce in fresh water if they happen to escape.

References

Further reading
 Peter B. Moyle, Inland Fishes of California (University of California Press, 2002), pp. 434–435
 

Gillichthys
Fish described in 1864
Taxa named by James Graham Cooper